Shortwave bands are frequency allocations for use within the shortwave radio spectrum (the upper medium frequency [MF] band and all of the high frequency [HF] band). Radio waves in these frequency ranges can be used for very long distance (transcontinental) communication because they can reflect off layers of charged particles in the ionosphere and return to Earth beyond the horizon, a mechanism called skywave or “skip” propagation. They are allocated by the ITU for radio services such as maritime communications, international shortwave broadcasting and worldwide amateur radio.  The bands are conventionally named by their wavelength in metres, for example the ‘20 meter band’. Radio propagation and possible communication distances vary depending on the time of day, the season and the level of solar activity.

International broadcast bands

These bands are used by powerful long range AM radio stations, many operated by governments, which broadcast to multiple countries.  Most international broadcasters use amplitude modulation with 5 kHz steps between channels; a few use single sideband or reduced carrier single sideband modulation. The World Radiocommunication Conference (WRC), organized under the auspices of the International Telecommunication Union, allocates bands for various services in periodic conferences. The most recent WRC took place in 2012. At WRC-97 in 1997, the following bands were allocated for international broadcasting:

Particularly in the United States and at frequencies under 10 MHz, shortwave broadcasters may operate in between those bands. WTWW (whose main programming is on 5.085), WBCQ (5.130) and WRMI (9.335, 7.73, 7.78) all operate at least some of their frequencies outside the designated shortwave bands.

Amateur HF bands

Amateur radio operators in many countries are allocated several shortwave bands for private, non-commercial use. Amateur radio is a communications service, educational tool and hobby. It is particularly useful in providing emergency communication where standard telecommunications infrastructure is compromised or nonexistent, such as a disaster area or remote region of the globe.

Marine, air, land mobile and fixed allocations
Designated bands in the shortwave spectrum are used for ships, aircraft, and land vehicles. Shortwave (HF radio) is used by transoceanic aircraft for communications with air-traffic control centers out of VHF radio range. Most countries with HF citizens'-band allocations use 40 or 80 channels between approximately 26.5 MHz and 27.9 MHz, in 10 kHz steps.

Due to antenna-length requirements and the band's long-distance propagation characteristics (undesirable in these cases), much land-mobile radio activity has moved to VHF or UHF and most cordless-phone use is at UHF or higher. Some segments of the HF spectrum are allocated for fixed services, providing point-to-point communication between sites with no access to wired communications.

Illegal "freeband" CB activity can be heard from 25 to 28 MHz, steps with operators generally using AM below 26.965 (US and European CB channel 1) and SSB above 27.405 (US and European CB channel 40). CB radio in the UK can be heard from 27.60125 to 27.99125 MHz in 10 kHz steps as well as the lower 26.965 to 27.405 MHz allocation.

The UK and Ireland both operate Community Audio Distribution (CADS) in the UK or Wireless Public Address System (WPAS) in Ireland  services in the 27.600 to 27.995 MHz portion, AM and FM mode, with two overlapping sets of 40 channels (27.60125 to 27.99125 MHz in 10 kHz steps, and 27.605 to 27.995 MHz in 10 kHz steps).  These transmissions are usually rebroadcasts of church services and can sometimes be heard hundreds or even thousands of km (miles). Part of the 11 m/27 MHz band was also allocated in many countries for early-model cordless phones.

Military HF use 
In the US and Canada, as well as the Americas (ITU Region 2) as a whole, there are no pre-designated HF allocations for military use.
Similar rules exist in Europe, where it has become necessary for European amateurs to police the bands due to overcrowding. Most military HF band incursions into the HF ham bands occur in Europe or Africa. Since the end of the Cold War specific military HF allocations have gradually disappeared from the HF bands, except for Africa and some parts of Asia. In Australia, the military shares the HF bands with civilian users; this is mainly due to low population density and relative under-use of the HF bands. The military in the Americas and Australia has tended to use the civilian fixed, maritime mobile and aeronautical mobile allocations on an ad hoc (non-interference) basis.

Industrial/Scientific/Medical (ISM) and other HF allocations 

Above 10 MHz there are numerous frequencies set aside for radio astronomy, space research (FCC terminology) and standard- frequency-and-time services. RF diathermy equipment uses 27.12 MHz to heat bulk materials or adhesives for the purpose of drying or improving curing. The industrial use of the frequency suggested the use of the 11 m band for CB radio. About a dozen narrow ("sliver") allocations for ISM exist throughout the radio spectrum. These allocations are among the smallest in the HF band, with respect to national HF allocations.

See also
 World Administrative Radio Conference

References

External links
 American Radio Relay League – the United States lobbying body for amateur radio and the body responsible for the ARRL Handbook
 Radio Amateurs of Canada – Canada's National Amateur Radio Society
 EiBi & DX – Complete list of International Broadcasting Stations worldwide, frequently updated
 UnwantedEmissions.com – Radio spectrum allocations reference
 short-wave.info – Easy to interrogate frequency schedules of short wave broadcasters
 US Amateur Radio Bands chart
 IARU Region 1 Monitoring System – English and German languages monthly reports on HF amateur bands intruders

Bandplans

es:Bandas de frecuencia
fr:Haute fréquence